The Right Reverend  Jabez Cornelius Whitley (20 January 1837 – 13 October 1904) was an Anglican author and a bishop in India from 1890 until 1904.

He was born in London on 20 January 1837 and educated at Queens' College, Cambridge and ordained in 1861. He was an SPG Missionary in Delhi and then  Ranchi before his elevation to the episcopate as the inaugural Bishop of Chota Nagpur. He died on 13 October 1904.

Works
Primer of the Mundari Language, 1896
Hindi Catechisms, 1897
Translation of the Didache and the Epistles of St Ignatius, 1899

Notes

1837 births
Anglican clergy from London
Alumni of Queens' College, Cambridge
19th-century Anglican bishops in Asia
20th-century Anglican bishops in Asia
Anglican bishops of Chota Nagpur
1904 deaths